Powell Library is the main college undergraduate library on the campus of the University of California, Los Angeles (UCLA). Powell Library is also known as the College Library. It was constructed from 1926 to 1929 and was one of the original four buildings that comprised the UCLA campus in the early period of the university's life. Its Romanesque Revival architecture design, its historic value and its popularity with students make it one of the defining images of UCLA.

Style
Like the building facing it across the quad, Royce Hall, the building's exterior is modeled after Milan's Basilica of Sant'Ambrogio.

The entrance of the library is adorned with several mosaics, one of which depicts two men holding a book bearing the phrase, from Cicero's Pro Archia Poeta, "Haec studia adulescentiam alunt, senectutem oblectant" ("These studies nourish youth and delight old age"), an appropriate dictum for the vast collection for undergraduate students.

There are also Renaissance Printers' Marks on the ceiling.

History
The library is named for Lawrence Clark Powell, the University Librarian at UCLA from 1944 to 1961 and Dean of the Graduate School of Library Service from 1960 to 1966. It is part of the extensive UCLA Library system.  The Graduate School of Library and Information Science, as GSLS was later known, was housed for many years in the southwestern corner of the top floor.  During this period the building also contained a separate unit of the campus library system devoted to education and psychology, which was later closed and its collection distributed among the other campus libraries.

In 1951, author Ray Bradbury wrote an early draft of his classic novel Fahrenheit 451 in Powell Library using typewriters that were then available for rent.

Students at UCLA have affectionately called this library "Club Powell" because it has a reputation for being louder than most libraries. Others explain that it is because this library has a room called Night Powell that is open 24/7 beginning on third week. Currently, the whole library is open 24/7 during tenth and finals week. The Inquiry Desk staff provides fruit and coffee during this stressful time. Powell hosts de-stressor programs during tenth and finals week, which include bringing therapy dogs, origami stations, and meditation. Located in the second floor Rotunda, this UCLA library often hosts events. Past events include the Edible Book Festival, Silent Disco, Video Game Orchestra, and International Games Day.

Services
The Hoover Collection is a digital collection of photos from the late 1920s to 1950s that features Powell Library, Royce Hall, and the construction of Janss Steps.

Powell Library is part of the "Ask A Librarian" service, where people can chat with a University of California librarian 24/7.

See also
Royce Hall
UCLA Library
Maine East High School

References

External links

Library buildings completed in 1929
University and college academic libraries in the United States
University of California, Los Angeles buildings and structures
Romanesque Revival architecture in California
Libraries in Los Angeles